The Immaculate Conception Cathedral or simply Cathedral of Victoria, is a religious building of the Catholic Church located in the town of Victoria, on the island of Mahé capital of the African archipelago nation of Seychelles.

The cathedral is located near the Clock Tower (Tour de l'Horloge) and the Anglican Cathedral. The church was built in 1874 and recalls the French colonial style.

It is part of the Latin Church and Roman Rite, and serves as the seat of the bishop of the Diocese of Port Victoria which was established in 1892 by Pope Leo XIII. The first reconstruction of the cathedral started in the same year.

See also
Roman Catholicism in Seychelles

References

Roman Catholic cathedrals in Seychelles
Buildings and structures in Victoria, Seychelles
Roman Catholic churches completed in 1874
19th-century Roman Catholic church buildings in Seychelles